Fisting, handballing, fist-fucking, brachiovaginal, or brachioproctic insertion is a sexual activity that involves inserting a hand into the vagina or rectum. Once insertion is complete, the fingers are either clenched into a fist or kept straight. Fisting may be performed without a partner, but it is most often a partnered activity.

History

Fisting's emergence as a popular sexual practice is commonly attributed to gay male culture and it may not have existed until the twentieth century. Robert Morgan Lawrence, a sex educator, however, believes the practice dates back thousands of years.  The most famous fisting club in the world was the Catacombs, located in San Francisco, which operated during the 1970s and 1980s. The Handball Express was another such club. Crisco was commonly used as a lubricant, before more specialized personal lubricants became available.

In the 1980s, it was assumed that unprotected fisting—which often produces small injuries to the anus, permitting microorganisms access to the blood—was an easy route for transmission of HIV. This, combined with sexual squeamishness towards the public fisting culture in gay establishments of San Francisco, led gay writer Randy Shilts to successfully campaign for the closure of venues, such as gay bathhouses and sex clubs, that openly permitted it. Fisting gradually returned as a sexual practice over the next 30 years.

The San Francisco South of Market Leather History Alley consists of four works of art along Ringold Alley honoring leather culture; it opened in 2017. One of the works of art is metal bootprints along the curb which honor 28 people who were an important part of the leather communities of San Francisco; those honored include Steve McEachern, owner of the fisting club the Catacombs, and Bert Herman, leader of the fisting community, author, and publisher.

Techniques

The "silent duck", also called "duck-billing", is the technique often used in which the person engaging in hand insertion shapes the hand to resemble a duck's beak. Typically, fisting does not involve forcing the clenched fist into the vagina or rectum; this is a practice called "punching". Instead, all five fingers are kept straight and held as close together as possible (forming the beak-like "duck"), then slowly inserted into a well lubricated vagina or rectum.

In more vigorous forms of fisting, such as "punching" or "punchfisting", a fully clenched fist may be inserted and withdrawn slowly.

Fistees who are more experienced may take two fists (double-fisting). In the case of double-fisting, pleasure is derived more from the stretching of the anus or vagina than from the thrusting (in-and-out) movement of hands.

Risks
Fisting can cause laceration or perforation of the vagina, perineum, rectum, or colon, resulting in serious injury and even death. In addition, sexual activities that forces air into the vagina can lead to a fatal air embolism, predominantly during pregnancy.

Anal fisting carries risks of colorectal perforation; participants are advised to use latex gloves and lubricant, and designate a safeword, the utterance of which will call an immediate halt to the activity. The practice, along with the insertion of hard objects into the anus, has been significantly related to the traumatization of the rectal mucosa in increasing the likelihood of infection, including Hepatitis B.

Legal status

In the United Kingdom fisting is legal to perform; however, the Crown Prosecution Service considers publication of fisting material to be grounds for prosecution under the Obscene Publications Act 1959. Despite the CPS's guidance, in the case of R v Peacock in 2012, Michael Peacock was found not guilty of breaching the Obscene Publications Act for selling DVDs containing anal fisting. There was also an unsuccessful extreme pornography prosecution in 2012 where it was argued by the prosecution that images of anal fisting constitute extreme pornography and thus are illegal to possess because the act is "likely to result in serious injury to a person's anus, breasts or genitals".

In the United States, according to attorney Allan Gelbard there is nothing "per se illegal" about any pornography so long as it is not child pornography, however, it can be found to be obscene. Fisting is on the Cambria List, a list of sex acts which may be prosecutable under U.S. obscenity law, created by lawyer Paul Cambria in 2001. The list is intended to act as guidelines to help producers avoid obscenity lawsuits.

See also

 Anal sex
 Human sexual activity
 Sex toy
 Sexual intercourse
 Sexual penetration

Notes

References

 
 Donovan B; Tindall B; Cooper D. Brachioproctic eroticism and transmission of retrovirus associated with acquired immune deficiency syndrome (AIDS). Genitourin Med. 1986 Dec;62(6):390-2.
 
 
 Medical terminology and some information on risks were taken from The Intelligent Man's Guide To Handball, a guide to man-on-man fisting.

Anal eroticism
Sexual acts
Vagina